This is a list of notable amateur and professional snooker players, past and present.

A

Hugh Abernethy
Khaled Belaid Abumdas
Pankaj Advani
Subhash Agarwal
Khurram Hussain Agha
Omprakesh Agrawal
Farakh Ajaib
Hamza Akbar 
Joven Alba
Shokat Ali
Gareth Allen
Mark Allen
Amine Amiri
Ian Anderson
Roy Andrewartha
Muhammad Asif
John Astley
Justin Astley
Au Chi-wai

B

Bai Langning
Bai Yulu
Sam Baird
Roger Bales
June Banks
John Barrie
Maureen Baynton
John Bear
Simon Bedford
Bernard Bennett
Mark Bennett
Bi Zhu Qing
Stuart Bingham
Jonathan Birch
Ian Black
Iulian Boiko
Josh Boileau
Antony Bolsover
Matthew Bolton
Nigel Bond
Emma Bonney
Alex Borg
Mark Boyle
Luca Brecel
Karl Broughton
Albert Brown
Alec Brown
Jordan Brown
Oliver Brown
Paddy Browne
Ian Brumby
Shawn Budd
Alfie Burden
Jamie Burnett
Ian Burns
Karl Burrows
Craig Butler

C 

James Cahill
Vinnie Calabrese
Duncan Campbell
John Campbell
Steve Campbell
Marcus Campbell
Aaron Canavan
Tammy Cantoni
Cao Xinlong
Cao Yupeng
Thelma Carpenter
Tom Carpenter
Stuart Carrington
Ali Carter
Ashley Carty
Billy Castle
Maria Catalano
Paul Cavney
Franky Chan
Chan Wai Ki
Harvey Chandler
Anuja Chandra-Thakur
Manan Chandra
Chang Bingyu
Bob Chaperon
Tony Chappel
Eddie Charlton
Chen Feilong
Chen Zhe
Chen Zifan
George Chenier
Cheung Ka-wai
Martin Clark
Rhys Clark
Ryan Clark
Darren Clarke
Jamie Clarke
Eva Collins
Wayne Cooper
Albert Cope
Jamie Cope
Gareth Coppack
Karen Corr
Matthew Couch
Sam Craigie
Stephen Craigie
Graham Cripsey
Jeff Cundy
Jamie Curtis-Barrett

D 

Dominic Dale
Brijesh Damani
Mike Darrington
Agnes Davies
Adam Davies
Alex Davies
Anthony Davies
Paul Davies
Fred Davis
Joe Davis
Mark Davis
Steve Davis
Paul Davison
Ryan Day
Joe Delaney
Patrick Delsemme
Tom Dennis
Corey Deuel
Peter Devlin
Ding Junhui
Les Dodd
Ken Doherty
Scott Donaldson
Walter Donaldson
Jim Donnelly
Graeme Dott
Tony Drago
Adam Duffy
Steve Duggan
Kurt Dunham
Mike Dunn
Spencer Dunn
John Dunning
Nick Dyson
Martin Dziewialtowski

E 

Peter Ebdon
Ray Edmonds
Craig Edwards
Patrick Einsle
Basem Eltahhan
Laura Evans
Reanne Evans
Clive Everton

F 

Patsy Fagan
Fan Zhengyi
Fang Xiongman
Ann-Marie Farren
Jason Ferguson
Leo Fernandez
Igor Figueiredo
Kacper Filipiak
David Finbow
Allison Fisher
Kelly Fisher
Mandy Fisher
Mick Fisher
Jack Fitzmaurice
Mark Flowerdew
Robby Foldvari
Tom Ford
Sue Foster
Geoff Foulds
Neal Foulds
Danny Fowler
Manuel Francisco
Peter Francisco
Silvino Francisco
Sidney Fry
Marco Fu
Fung Kwok Wai

G 

Gao Yang 
Roger Garrett
Marcel Gauvreau
Michael Georgiou
Mario Geudens
Dave Gilbert (born 1961)
David Gilbert
Nigel Gilbert
Peter Gilchrist
Colm Gilcreest
John Giles
Surinder Gill
Ian Glover
Rodney Goggins
Brady Gollan
Martin Gould
David Grace
Robbie Grace
Ian Graham
David Gray
Mark Gray
David Greaves
Joe Grech
Gerard Greene
Terry Griffiths
Adrian Gunnell
Guo Hua

H 

Mike Hallett
Steven Hallworth
Anthony Hamilton
Ben Hancorn
Bjorn Haneveer
Quinten Hann
John Hargreaves
Dave Harold
Vic Harris
Ruth Harrison
Barry Hawkins
Muriel Hazeldene
Louis Heathcote
Kristján Helgason
Euan Henderson
Stephen Hendry
Katie Henrick
Drew Henry
Andy Hicks
Alex Higgins
John Higgins
Andrew Higginson
Liam Highfield
Aaron Hill
Darryl Hill
Stacey Hillyard
Kishan Hirani
Chandra Hirjee
David Hogan
Herbert Holt
Michael Holt
Graham Horne
Lynette Horsburgh
Pat Houlihan
Declan Hughes
Eugene Hughes
Ashley Hugill
Robin Hull
Paul Hunter
Mehmet Husnu

I

Mohamed Ibrahim
Lisa Ingall
Melbourne Inman
Jaique Ip

J 

Steve James
Wendy Jans
Rafał Jewtuch
Jin Long
Shailesh Jogia
Kuldesh Johal
David John
Dilwyn John
Joe Johnson
Mark Johnston-Allen
Bradley Jones
Duane Jones
Hannah Jones
Jak Jones
Jamie Jones
Tony Jones
Wayne Jones
Frank Jonik
Mark Joyce
Ju Reti
Ben Judge
Michael Judge

K 

Issara Kachaiwong
Amee Kamani
Daniel Kandi
Jack Karnehm
Boonyarit Keattikun
Julie Kelly
Rebecca Kenna
Kingsley Kennerley
Christopher Keogan
Mohamed Khairy
Mark King
Warren King
Lukas Kleckers
Tony Knowles

L 

Sanderson Lam
John Lardner
Rod Lawler
Fred Lawrence
James Leadbetter
Andy Lee
Stephen Lee
Sydney Lee
Lei Peifan
Gerrit bij de Leij
Sue LeMaich
Steve Lemmens
Margaret Lennan
Kritsanut Lertsattayathorn
Michael Leslie
Li Hang
Li Yan
Li Yuan
Liang Wenbo
Simon Lichtenberg
David Lilley
Horace Lindrum
Oliver Lines
Peter Lines
Jack Lisowski
Liu Chuang
Liu Song
Steve Longworth
Lü Chenwei
Lu Ning
Luo Honghao
Lyu Haotian

M 

Craig MacGillivray
Scott MacKenzie
Murdo MacLeod
Sean Maddocks
Kurt Maflin
Chitra Magimairaj
Stephen Maguire
Atthasit Mahitthi
Rouzi Maimaiti
Marlon Manalo
Alec Mann
Mitchell Mann
Stuart Mann
Perrie Mans
Bob Marshall
Robert Marshall
Dave Martin
Youssra Matine
Anna Mazhirina
Stefan Mazrocis
James McBain
Chris McBreen
Clark McConachy
Maryann McConnell
Ian McCulloch
David McDonnell
Anthony McGill
Dermot McGlinchey
Lesley McIlrath
Jack McLaughlin
David McLellan
Rory McLeod
Alan McManus
Paul McPhillips
Jim Meadowcroft
Steve Meakin
Paul Medati
Aditya Mehta
Mei Xiwen
Babken Melkonyan
Chris Melling
Shaun Mellish
Dean Mellway
Tony Meo
Yasin Merchant
Hanna Mergies
Hammad Miah
Jimmy Michie
Paul Mifsud
Steve Mifsud
Graham Miles
Robert Milkins
Steve Mizerak
Moh Keen Ho
Saleh Mohammad
Brian Morgan
Darren Morgan
Paddy Morgan
Mario Morra
Agnes Morris
David Morris
Doug Mountjoy
Ross Muir
Vincent Muldoon
Lasse Münstermann
Shaun Murphy
Stephen Murphy
Terry Murphy
Tommy Murphy

N 

R Umadevi Nagaraj
Anastasia Nechaeva
Steve Newbury
Stanley Newman
Tom Newman
Ng On Yee
Niu Zhuang
Chris Norbury
Andrew Norman
Florian Nüßle

O 

Joe O'Boye
Fergal O'Brien
Joe O'Connor
Martin O'Donnell
Brendan O'Donoghue
Dene O'Kane
Bill Oliver
Jamie O'Neill
Suzie Opacic
Ronnie O'Sullivan
Sean O'Sullivan
Gary Owen
Marcus Owen
Ken Owers

P 

Jackson Page
Lee Page
Andrew Pagett
Alex Pagulayan
Munraj Pal
Pang Junxu
Pang Weiguo
Kathy Parashis
Emma Parker
Maurice Parkin
John Parrott
Riley Parsons
Fraser Patrick
Karl Payne
Nick Pearce
Joe Perry
Naveen Perwani
Stuart Pettman
Phaitoon Phonbun
Tai Pichit
Vidya Pillai
Barry Pinches
Gary Ponting
Kwan Poomjang
Dechawat Poomjaeng
Ashot Potikyan
Ian Preece
Steve Prest
Mick Price
Jason Prince
Kelsall Prince
John Pulman

Q 

Lisa Quick
Michael Quinn

R 

Jackie Rea
John Rea
John Read
Ray Reardon
Stuart Reardon
Tyler Rees
Fred Van Rensburg
Jimmy van Rensberg
Dean Reynolds
Cliff Rickard
Anita Rizzuti
Lewis Roberts
Jimmy Robertson
Neil Robertson
Alain Robidoux
David Roe
Adrian Rosa
Colin Roscoe
Stephen Rowlings

S 

Noppon Saengkham
Supoj Saenla
Ahmed Saif
Brian Salmon
Arantxa Sanchis
Noppadol Sangnil
Itaro Santos
Brandon Sargeant
Chris Scanlon
Diana Schuler
George Scott
Mark Selby
Vera Selby
Matthew Selt
Geet Sethi
Eden Sharav
Kim Shaw
Troy Shaw
Dessie Sheehan
Mohammed Shehab
Michael Shelton
Shi Chunxia
Shi Hanqing
Yana Shut
Si Jiahui
Luke Simmonds
Sakchai Sim Ngam
Warren Simpson
Eddie Sinclair
Elliot Slessor
Chris Small
Fred Smith
Jason Smith
Martin Smith
Sidney Smith
Willie Smith
Billy Snaddon
Akani Songsermsawad
John Spencer
Lee Spick
Diana Stateczny
Craig Steadman
Adam Stefanow
Natalie Stelmach
Robert Stephen
Kirk Stevens
Matthew Stevens
Harry Stokes
Roy Stolk
Sean Storey
Waratthanun Sukritthanes
Zak Surety
Passakorn Suwannawat
Joe Swail

T 

James Tatton
Allan Taylor
David Taylor
Dennis Taylor
Nick Terry
Thanawat Thirapongpaiboon
Thor Chuan Leong
Cliff Thorburn
Willie Thorne
Paul Thornley
Tian Pengfei
Chris Totten
Judd Trump

U 

Thepchaiya Un-Nooh
Alexander Ursenbacher

V 

Hossein Vafaei
Soheil Vahedi
Kevin Van Hove
Tatjana Vasiljeva
Lucky Vatnani
John Virgo

W 

Chris Wakelin
Caroline Walch
Ricky Walden
Joel Walker
Lee Walker
Nick Walker
Patrick Wallace
Katrina Wan
Wang Yuchen
Michael Wasley
Paul Watchorn
James Wattana
Mike Watterson
Daniel Wells
Bill Werbeniuk
Barry West
Jason Weston
Jimmy White
Michael White
John Whitty
Adam Wicheard
Michael Wild
Mark Wildman
Gary Wilkinson
Glen Wilkinson
Mark Williams
Philip Williams
Rex Williams
Ian Williamson
Robbie Williams
Cliff Wilson
Gary Wilson
Jamie Wilson
Kyren Wilson
Sydney Wilson
Bogdan Wołkowski
Nutcharut Wongharuthai
Ben Woollaston
Rochelle Woods
Jon Wright
Wu Yize
Wu Yu Lin
Jim Wych
Paul Wykes

X 

Xiao Guodong
Xu Si

Y 

Yan Bingtao
Hatem Yassen
Ratchayothin Yotharuck
Dean Young
Muhammad Yousaf
Yu Delu
Yuan Sijun

Z 

Zhang Anda
Zhang Jiankang
Zhang Yong
Zhao Jianbo
Zhao Xintong
Zhou Yuelong

References